Loopmasters is an English sound design record label based in Brighton, England. Loopmasters is mainly known for releasing and publishing sample packs on the pro-audio market and cooperating with software and hardware vendors including Ableton Live and Focusrite. Since 2008 Loopmasters also functions as an online store for music composers, and computer-based DAWs like Steinberg Cubase, Apple Logic, Propellerheads Reason or Ableton Live. The record label is known for releasing samples of performers, producers and DJs such as Deadmau5, Rezone, Coldcut, Full Cycle, Mad Professor, Meat Katie, Histibe, Todd Terry, Ray Keith, DJ Pierre etc.

The scope of musical genres released under Loopmasters cover multiple electronic music niches like Minimal House, Techno, Drum and Bass, Reggae as well as single-instrument sample libraries consisting of Loops and Sampler Presets. 

Loopmasters also serves as a portal for commercially dubbed "The Sample Boutique", which sells sample packs online. The portal also offers other sound design labels and the catalogue of titles is growing at a weekly rate.

During the Synthplex 2019 exhibition, 1010 Music announced  a new product in collaboration with Loopmasters as well as SoundTrack Loops , Blackbox. Loopmasters provided a part of the sound samples available in Blackbox, which is a desktop sampler.

In January 2017, Loopmasters announced the launch of a new music program, ‘Loopcloud, a sample library manager, in which music can be produced using already existing sample sounds and loops.  On 27 September 2018 Loopmasters released a third edition of Loopcloud. On 11 April 2019 Loopcloud 4.0 was released along with a Loop Editor, a feature that facilitates loop makers.

References

External links
 www.loopmasters.com
loopcloud-play-update

English record labels
Record labels based in Brighton, East Sussex